Sodium aluminium hydride or sodium alanate is an inorganic compound with the chemical formula NaAlH4.  It is a white pyrophoric solid that dissolves in tetrahydrofuran (THF), but not in diethyl ether or hydrocarbons.  It has been evaluated as an agent for the reversible storage of hydrogen and it is used as a reagent for the chemical synthesis of organic compounds. Similar to lithium aluminium hydride, it is a salt consisting of separated sodium cations and tetrahedral AlH anions.

Structure, preparation, and reactions
Sodium tetrahydroaluminate adopts the structure of (is isostructural with) calcium tungstate.  As such, the tetrahedral AlH centers are linked with eight-coordinat Na+ cations.
The compound is prepared from the elements under high pressures of H2 at 200 °C using triethylaluminium catalyst:
Na  +  Al  +  2 H2  →   NaAlH4

As a suspension in diethyl ether, it reacts with lithium chloride to give the popular reagent lithium aluminium hydride:
LiCl  +  NaAlH4 →   LiAlH4  +  NaCl

The compound reacts rapidly, even violently, with protic reagents, such as water, as described in this idealized equation:
4 H2O  +  NaAlH4 →   "NaAl(OH)4"  +  4 H2

Applications

Hydrogen storage
Sodium alanate has been explored for hydrogen storage in hydrogen tanks. The relevant reactions are:
 3 NaAlH4  → Na3AlH6+ 2 Al +  3 H2
 Na3AlH6   →   3 NaH + Al +  3/2 H2

Absorption can be slow, with several minutes being required to fill a tank. Both release and uptake are catalysed by titanium.

Reagent in organic chemistry
Sodium aluminium hydride is a strong reducing agent, very similar in reactivity to lithium aluminum hydride (LAH) and, to some extent, Diisobutylaluminium hydride (DIBAL) in organic reactions. It is much more powerful reducing agent than sodium borohydride due to the weaker and more polar Al-H bond compared to the B-H bond.  Like LAH, it reduces esters to alcohols.

Safety
Sodium aluminium hydride is highly flammable. It does not react in dry air at room temperature but is very sensitive to moisture.  It ignites or explodes on contact with water.

See also
Complex metal hydride

References 

Sodium compounds
Aluminium complexes
Hydrogen storage
Metal hydrides
Reducing agents